Akbar Laghari is Pakistani writer of Urdu and Sindhi Languages L. Currently posted as secretary to Govt. of Sindh for Education and literacy department belongs to Sindh Pakistan.

Early life 
Akbar's full name is Ghulam Akbar Laghari. He was born on 30 November 1963, at Village Talho Khan Laghari, close to Bhanoth town of Hala Taluka, Matiari District, Sindh.

Career
Akber Laghari did MA in economics from University of Sindh, Jamshoro in 1987. He was appointed as a lecturer through Sindh Public Service Commission in 1991 and later in 1992 he was appointed as Assistant Commissioner through competitive examination of CSS. He has authored many books about history of Sindhi literature and criticism. His books Sindhi Adabi Jo Mukhtasir Jaezo, Falsafey Ji Mukhtasir Tareekh, its Urdu version Falsafey Ki Mukhtasir Tareekh and Adabi Tanqeed ki Tareekh can be counted as his main literary contribution. He serves as chairperson of Sindhi Language Authority, Hyderabad as well as secretary of Culture, Tourism and Antiquity department of Sindh.

References 

Pakistani writers
Sindhi-language writers
Writers from Sindh
Living people
1963 births